Holonotus is a genus of beetles in the family Cerambycidae, containing the following species:

 Holonotus laevithorax (White, 1853)
 Holonotus latithorax Thomson 1861
 Holonotus nigroaeneus Bates, 1869
 Holonotus sternalis Gahan, 1894

References

Prioninae